West Point is a city in Clay County, Mississippi, United States, in the Golden Triangle region of the state. The population was 11,307 at the 2010 census. It is the county seat of Clay County and the principal city of the West Point Micropolitan Statistical Area, which is part of the larger Columbus-West Point Combined Statistical Area.

Geography

Demographics

West Point is located in the northeast section of Mississippi just across the Alabama state line. The city has a rich heritage, with generations of family lineage calling it home. Historically the area has a blend of African American, White and Native American lineage. The city has many social activities sponsored by church and civic organizations.

2020 census

As of the 2020 United States Census, there were 10,105 people, 4,211 households, and 2,523 families residing in the city.

2010 census
As of the census of 2010, there were 11,307 people 4,444 households, and 3,043 families residing in the city. The population density was 535.13 people per square mile (225.3/km). There were 4,856 housing units at an average density of 235.3 per square mile (90.9/km). The racial makeup of the city was 37.57% White, 61.40% African American, 0.01% Native American, 0.18% Asian, 0.1% from other races, and 0.2% from two or more races. Hispanic or Latino people of any race was 0.88% of the population.

There were 3,043 households, out of which 22.2% had own children under the age of 18 living with them, 35.1% were married couples living together, 28.4% had a female householder with no husband present, male household no wife present 4.9% and 31.5% were non-families. 28.6% of all households were made up of individuals, and 28.7% had someone living alone who was 65 years of age or older. The average household size was 2.48, and the average family size was 3.04.

In the city, the population was spread out, with 22.6% under the age of 18, 6.4% from 20 to 24, 23.7% from 25 to 44, 25.1% from 45 to 64, and 15.1% who were 65 years of age or older. The median age was 36.4 years. The population was 53.7% female and 46.3% male.

The median income for a household in the city was $30,440, and the median income for a family was $39,295. The per capita income for the city was $17,675. About 23.4% of families and 24.6% of the population were below the poverty line, including 37.8% of those under age 18 and 13.6% of those people age 65 or over.

Economy

Large businesses in West Point include Southern Ionics, Babcock & Wilcox, and Mossy Oak. Bryan Foods was founded in West Point in 1936 by John H. Bryan, Sr and W.B. Bryan. Bryan Foods was acquired by Sara Lee Corporation in 1968 and continued operations in West Point until March 2007. West Point has an ever-increasing economic sector with the opening of the new Prairie Belt Power Site. The site allows advantage to West Point with its easy access to major highways, waterways and railways; ample electric power and natural gas resources; and access to three airports.

Arts and culture
Old Waverly Golf Club, located outside of West Point and recognized as one of Mississippi's top golf courses, hosted the 1999 U.S. Women's Open, which was won by Juli Inkster. West Point Country Club is three minutes from downtown West Point and offers 18 rounds of golf, swimming, tennis and a club house.

Payne Field was an advanced aviation school operated from May 1918 to March 1920. About 1,500 pilots were trained there. It is recognized as the first airfield in the state of Mississippi.

Despite averaging less than 1" of snow a year, West Point was the home of the original Blazon-Flexible Flyer, Inc. proclaimed to make the best snow sled in the United States, which became an American tradition.

Waverly Plantation Mansion, eight miles east of West Point, is a National Historic Landmark. Its four-story cantilevered stair hall and cupola are considered unique in the United States. The mansion is open daily for tours from 9 am to 5 pm. An admission fee is charged.

West Point is the home of the Howlin' Wolf Blues Museum. Each Labor Day weekend the town of West Point hosts the Prairie Arts Festival. The weekend kicks off with the Howlin’ Wolf Blues Festival on Friday night followed by the Prairie Arts Festival during the day on Saturday. The festival showcases the areas arts and crafts with shopping, music, rides for children, a 5K race and a car show.

Education
Public education in the city of West Point is provided by the West Point Consolidated School District.

The West Point Green Wave football team has won the state championship for their classification 11 times, in 1982, 1987, 1988, 1989, 2005, 2009, 2010, 2016, 2017, 2018 and 2019.

West Point is the home of three high schools: West Point High School, the town's lone public high school, offers a diverse classroom environment and is the largest of the three. Oak Hill Academy and Hebron Christian School are tuition based private schools.

Oak Hill Academy is a private PK-12 school that was founded in 1966 as a segregation academy for white students.

Notable people
 Jesse Anderson, professional football player 
 Tyrone Bell, professional football player
 Orlando Bobo, professional football player 
 Wirt Bowman, capitalist, entrepreneur, and one of the founders of the Agua Caliente Casino and Hotel
 George W. Bryan, local businessman, former CEO of Sara Lee Foods
 John H. Bryan, local businessman and former chairman of Sara Lee Corporation 
 Silas Chandler (1838-1919), co-founder of Mount Hermon Baptist Church
 John Davidson, former member of the Illinois Senate
 Vontarrius Dora, football outside linebacker
 Kevin Dotson, football offensive guard
 Jesse Dukeminier (1925–2003), professor of law
 David Gibbs, legislator, businessman
 Karl Gibbs, member of the Mississippi House of Representatives
 Tom Goode, professional football player 
 Johnny Green, football player
 Toxey Haas, founder and CEO of Haas Outdoors, Inc.
 Floyd Heard, retired track and field sprinter
 Carey Henley, football player
 Paul V. Hester, Commander, Pacific Air Forces; Air Component Commander for the Commander, U.S. Pacific Command, Hickam Air Force Base, Hawaii, 2004–2007
 Don Hopkins, pinch runner for the Oakland Athletics 
 Dewayne Jefferson, former professional basketball player
 Lyndon Johnson, football defensive end
 Reuben D. Jones, retired United States Army major general
 Bubba Phillips, baseball player
 Lenore L. Prather, Chief Justice of the Mississippi Supreme Court
 Dolph Pulliam, former basketball player
 Earl T. Ricks, U.S. Air Force major general, Chief of the National Guard Bureau and mayor of Hot Springs, Arkansas
 Larry Semon, actor, director, producer, and screenwriter during the silent film era
 Brad Smith (born 1968), guitarist for the band Blind Melon
 Rogers Stevens (born 1970), guitarist for the band Blind Melon
 Barrett Strong, Motown singer who had Motown's first hit with "Money"
 Bennie Turner, legislator, lawyer
 Angela Turner-Ford, member of the Mississippi House of Representatives
 Michael Williams, film director, producer, screenwriter, cinematographer and Film editor
 Howlin' Wolf (real name Chester Arthur Burnett), blues musician, born in West Point
 Zora Young, blues singer

References 

Cities in Mississippi
Cities in Clay County, Mississippi
County seats in Mississippi
Micropolitan areas of Mississippi